Amphioctopus marginatus, also known as the coconut octopus and veined octopus, is a medium-sized cephalopod belonging to the genus Amphioctopus. It is found in tropical waters of the western Pacific Ocean. It commonly preys upon shrimp, crabs, and clams, and displays unusual behavior including bipedal walking and tool use (gathering coconut shells and seashells and using these for shelter).

Size and description
The octopus displays a typical color pattern with dark ramified lines similar to veins, usually with a yellow siphon. The arms are usually dark in color, with contrasting white suckers. In many color displays, a lighter trapezoidal area can be seen immediately below the eye.

Behavior and habits

The coconut octopus is found on sandy bottoms in bays or lagoons. It frequently buries itself in the sand with only its eyes uncovered.

In March 2005, researchers at the University of California, Berkeley, published an article in Science in which A. marginatus was reported to show bipedal locomotion. It is one of only two octopus species known to display such behavior, the other species being Abdopus aculeatus. The authors discovered this behavior in an area off Sulawesi, Indonesia, where the sandy bottom was littered with coconut shells. The bipedal motion appears to mimic a floating coconut.

Researchers from the Melbourne Museum in Australia claimed the coconut octopus uses tools for concealment and defense by gathering available debris to create a defensive fortress. This behavior was observed in individuals in Bali and North Sulawesi in Indonesia. The researchers filmed the octopus collecting coconut half-shells discarded by humans from the sea floor.

See also
Cephalopod intelligence

References

External links

 
 Octopus uses coconuts - Video via EducatedEarth
 Octopus marginatus at National Center for Biotechnology Information (NCBI)
News
 BBC article with video
 Guardian article with video
 Video using 2 sea shells as a defense shelter
 

Octopodidae
Tool-using animals
Molluscs described in 1964